Yankuba Badjie was Director-General of the National Intelligence Agency under former President Yahya Jammeh from December 2013 to 2016.

History

He was born in New Jeshwang in  Kanifing (Gambia). His father Arabou Badjie is ethnically Jola while his mother Binta Daffeh is a Mandinka from BrikamaKabadaa.

He went to Kandiba primary school in New Jeshwang and failed his Common Entrance Exam before proceeding to Crab Island Secondary School in the capital Banjul. After his second year at Crab Island he transferred to an Islamic school. After completing high school, he briefly worked in The Gambia before he relocated to the United States as an economic migrant alongside his brother Yusupha Badjie.

While in the United States, he lived in Seattle where he worked in home healthcare and Ohio where he worked as a laborer in a warehouse before returning to the Gambia. Due to his fathers connections to Yahya Jammeh, he was able to join the intelligence service and became Deputy Director General for Operations before being promoted to lead the NIA as Director-General in 2013.

In April 2016 Yankuba Badjie was personally involved in giving orders for the torture of protesters and the subsequent killings of United Democratic Party's Organizing Secretary and deputy regional Chairman, Solo Sanderg and Solo Krumah. He was also responsible for the disappearances of Alhagie Ceesay and Ebou Jobe, two Gambian-Americans who went missing while on vacation in The Gambia.

Following the Gambian presidential election, 2016 which toppled long-time dictator Jammeh, he was arrested in February 2017. He was later charged with the murder of Solo Sandeng. 
In December 2017 he became subject to sanctions by the United States.

References

2016–2017 Gambian constitutional crisis
Gambian Muslims
People from West Coast Division (The Gambia)